Sub7, or SubSeven or Sub7Server, is a Trojan horse program originally released in 1999. Its name was derived by spelling NetBus backwards ("suBteN") and swapping "ten" with "seven". As of June 2021, the development of Sub7 is being continued.

Because its typical use is to allow undetected and unauthorized access, Sub7 is usually described as a trojan horse by security experts. Starting with version 2.1 (1999) it could be controlled via IRC. As one security book phrased it: "This set the stage for all malicious botnets to come." Additionally Sub7 has some features deemed of little use in legitimate remote administration like keystroke logging.

Sub7 worked on the Windows 9x and on the Windows NT family of operating systems, up to and including Windows 8.1.

History 

Sub7 has been claimed to be the creation of a hacker with the handle "mobman". Some sources claim that the software has been developed by an unknown Romanian programmer. Until today, "mobman" claims to be the creator, but the original ownership of the software is not yet clearly attributed to a specific individual.

No development had occurred in several years until a new version was scheduled for release on February 28, 2010. 

In 2006 (sub7legends.net) re-opened with hundreds of thousands of users, and has kept Sub7 alive with clean downloads and support and new software releases.

SubSeven 2.3, released on March 9, 2010, was revamped to work on all 32-bit and 64-bit versions of Windows and includes TCP Tunnel and Password Recovery for browsers, instant messengers and email clients. It was very buggy and was not written in Delphi which the original author used. The website that claimed to do this is no longer active.

In June 2021, a completely new alpha version was released with a similar look and feel to the original release, but it is not developed by the original author.

Architecture and features 
Like other remote admin programs, Sub7 is distributed with a server and a client. The server is the program that the host must run in order to have their machines controlled remotely, and the client is the program with a GUI that the user runs on their own machine to control the server/host PC.  Computer security expert Steve Gibson once said that with these features, Sub7 allows a hacker to take "virtually complete control" over a computer. Sub7 is so invasive, he said, that anyone with it on their computer "might as well have the hacker standing right next to them" while using their computer.

Sub7 has more features than Netbus (webcam capture, multiple port redirect, user-friendly registry editor, chat and more), but it always tries to install itself into windows directory and it does not have activity logging.

According to a security analysis, Sub7's server-side (target computer) features include:
 recording:
 sound files from a microphone attached to the machine
 images from an attached video camera
 screen shots of the computer 
 retrieving a listing of recorded and cached passwords
 taking over an ICQ account used on the target machine (back then the most popular messaging service); added in version 2.1. This included the ability to disable the local use of the account and read the chat history
 features which were presumably intended to be used for prank or irritating purposes including:
 changing desktop colors
 opening and closing the optical drive
 swapping the mouse buttons
 turning the monitor off/on
 "text2speech" voice synthesizer which allowed the remote controller to have the computer "talk" to its user
 penetration testing features, including a port scanner and a port redirector

On the client-side the software had an "address book" that allowed the controller to know when the target computers are online. Additionally the server program could be customized before being delivered by a so-called server editor (an idea borrowed from Back Orifice 2000). Customizations possible with the Sub7 server editor included changing the port addresses, displaying a customized message upon installation that could be used for example "to deceive the victim and mask the true intent of the program". The Sub7 server could also be configured to notify the controller of IP address changes of the host machine by email, ICQ or IRC.

Connections to Sub7 servers can be password protected with a chosen password. A deeper reverse engineering analysis revealed however that "SubSeven's author has secretly included a hardcoded master password for all of his Trojans! The Trojan itself has been Trojaned". For Version 1.9 the master password is predatox and 14438136782715101980 for versions 2.1 through 2.2b. The Master Password for SubSeven DEFCON8 2.1 Backdoor is acidphreak.

Uses and incidents 
SubSeven has been used to gain unauthorized access to computers.  While it can be used for making mischief (such as making sound files play out of nowhere, change screen colors, etc.), it can also read keystrokes that occurred since the last boot—a capability that can be used to steal passwords and credit card numbers.

In 2003, a hacker began distributing a Spanish-language email purporting to be from security firm Symantec that was used to trick recipients into downloading Sub7.

Although Sub7 is not itself a worm (has no built-in self-propagation features) it has been leveraged by some worms such as W32/Leaves (2001).

Some versions of Sub7 include code from Hard Drive Killer Pro to format the hard drive, this code will only run if it matched the ICQ number of "7889118" (mobman's rival trojan author.)

See also
Back Orifice
Back Orifice 2000
Trojan horse (computing)
Malware
Backdoor (computing)
Rootkit
MiniPanzer and MegaPanzer
File binder

References

External links
 Website
 http://www.giac.org/paper/gcih/36/subseven-213-bonus/100239
 Darknet Diaries Podcast Ep 20:mobman
 Screenshot of subseven V2.2 readme

Windows remote administration software
Remote administration software
Windows trojans
Pascal (programming language) software